Witwicki is a Polish surname. Notable people with the surname include:

 Janusz Witwicki (1903–1946), Polish architect and art historian
 Stefan Witwicki (1801–1847), Polish poet
 Władysław Witwicki (1878–1948), Polish psychologist, philosopher, translator and artist

Polish-language surnames